This is a comprehensive list of all the men's doubles finals with the resulting champions for the Australian Open tennis tournament.

Champions

Australasian Championships

Australian Championships

Australian Open

Notes

References

External links
Australian Open Results Archive: Men's Doubles

See also

Australian Open other competitions
List of Australian Open men's singles champions
List of Australian Open women's singles champions 
List of Australian Open women's doubles champions
List of Australian Open mixed doubles champions

Grand Slam men's doubles
List of French Open men's doubles champions
List of Wimbledon gentlemen's doubles champions
List of US Open men's doubles champions
List of Grand Slam men's doubles champions

men's doubles
Australian Open Men's Doubles champions
Australian Open